"Alone with You" is a song written by Faron Young, Roy Drusky, and Lester Vanadore, sung by Faron Young, and released on the Capitol label. In June 1959, it peaked at No. 1 on Billboards country and western jockey chart. It spent 29 weeks on the charts and was also ranked No. 10 on Billboards 1958 year-end country and western chart.

See also
 Billboard year-end top 50 country & western singles of 1958

References

Faron Young songs
1958 songs